Leit.is an Icelandic internet search engine developed by the corporation DCG ehf. It is available both in an Icelandic and an English version and was launched on June 16, 1999. It was originally developed by NovaMedia based on Infoseek but today DCG ehf hosts and develops the search engine.

Functionality 

Leit.is's search engine can search for a term on a specific website and for titles of websites. It can also find websites which link to a given site as well as search for subdomains of websites.

See also 
 List of search engines

External links 
  
 About Leit.is 
 פרסום בגוגל

Internet search engines
Icelandic websites